

Champions
World Series: Philadelphia Athletics over St. Louis Cardinals (4–2)

Awards and honors
None

Statistical leaders

1Single season record for RBIs

Major league baseball final standings

American League final standings

National League final standings

Negro leagues final standings

Negro National League final standings
This was the eleventh of twelve seasons of the original Negro National League. For the second time in three years, the St. Louis Stars were champions of the Negro National League, owing to their postseason victory over the Detroit Stars on September 13-22.

East (independent teams) final standings
A loose confederation of teams were gathered in the East to compete with the West, however East teams did not organize a formal league as the West did.

Negro league postseason
By 1930, there had been no organized league for East Coast baseball in the Negro leagues (owing to the dissolution of the Eastern Colored League in 1928 and American Negro League in 1929). The remaining teams from the ANL and ECL played independent ball together, but they also played against teams from the Midwest. As such, the Homestead Grays challenged two teams from the NNL two distinct Series that were held over various stadiums and dates. The Grays challenged the St. Louis Stars in St. Louis on April 19 and April 22 and won twice. They challenged the Detroit Stars to four games held from August 21 to August 28 (two in Akron and two in Detroit), which Homestead won three. On August 30-September 3, they challenged the Stars to five games (all in St. Louis), and the Stars won four of five. At any rate, the independent East teams then had a "East Coast Championship Series", which matched the Grays and the New York Lincoln Giants (in that same month, the Negro National League had their Championship Series), with ten games spread out over Pittsburgh, New York, and Philadelphia.

1930 East Coast Championship Series: Homestead Grays over New York Lincoln Giants, 6–4
1930 Negro National League Championship Series: St. Louis Stars over Detroit Stars, 4–3

Events

January–June
April 14 – The 1930 season opens with the Boston Red Sox defeating the Washington Senators 4–3 at Griffith Stadium.
April 29 – Lefty Gomez pitches four innings and takes the loss in his major league debut.
May 6 – The Boston Red Sox trade Red Ruffing to the New York Yankees for Cedric Durst and $50,000.
May 9 – The Detroit Tigers defeat the New York Yankees 5–4 at Yankee Stadium. They set a record with only two outfield putouts.
May 11 – The Cleveland Indians defeat the Philadelphia Athletics 25–7.
May 12 – New York Giants pitcher Larry Benton surrenders six home runs to the Chicago Cubs, yet still gets the win.
May 30 – The New York Yankees trade Waite Hoyt and Mark Koenig to the Detroit Tigers for Ownie Carroll, Harry Rice and Yats Wuestling.
June 13 – The St. Louis Browns trade General Crowder and Heinie Manush to the Washington Senators for Goose Goslin.

July–September
July 8 – The New York Yankees are shut out, 4–0, by Rube Walberg and the Philadelphia Athletics. It is the Yankees' seventh loss in a row, and second shut out in that stretch (July 4 against the Washington Senators). They are the only two shut outs the Yankees suffer all season.
August 31 – The St. Louis Cardinals defeat the first place Chicago Cubs, 8–3. In the final 26 games of the season, the Cards go 22–4, and from fourth place in the National League to first.
September 10 – Hall of fame shortstop Luke Appling goes one-for-four in his major league debut as his Chicago White Sox fall 6–2 to the Boston Red Sox.
September 12 – Brooklyn Robins catcher Al López bounces one over the left field wall for his sixth home run of the season. It is the last such home run before the implementation of the ground rule double.

September 14 – Detroit Tigers Hall of famer Hank Greenberg makes his major league debut in a 10–3 loss to the New York Yankees.
September 20 – Bill Terry goes four-for-five in the first game of a double header and two-for-four in the second to raise his season average to .402. He goes five-for-seven in a double header the next day to see his average go as high as .406. He ends the season with a .401 batting average. He is the last National Leaguer to bat over .400.
September 28
Dizzy Dean gives up just three hits and one earned run in his major league debut to lead the St. Louis Cardinals to a 3–1 victory over the Pittsburgh Pirates.
Babe Ruth picks up a complete game victory against his former team, the Boston Red Sox on the final day of the season.

October–December
October 1 – The Philadelphia Athletics defeat the St. Louis Cardinals 5–2 in game one of the 1930 World Series despite being out hit 9–5. All five hits by the A's are for extra bases (a double, two triples & two home runs).
October 2 – A two out error by Cardinals second baseman Frankie Frisch leads to two unearned runs in the third inning as the A's cruise to a 6–1 victory in game two of the World Series.
October 4 – Bill Hallahan gets out of a bases loaded jam in the first inning by striking out Bing Miller. From there, he settles in, and leads the Cardinals to a 5–0 victory in game three of the World Series.
October 5 – Jimmie Dykes' throwing error in the fourth leads to two unearned runs as the Cardinals even up the series with a 3–1 victory.
October 6 – Jimmie Foxx breaks open a scoreless game with a two-run home run in the ninth to give the A's the 2–0 victory in game five.
October 8 – The Philadelphia Athletics defeated the St. Louis Cardinals, 7–1, in Game six of the World Series to win their second consecutive World championship, and fifth overall, four games to two. This would be the Athletics' last World Series championship in the city of Philadelphia.
October 14 – The Chicago Cubs trade Bill McAfee and Wes Schulmerich to the Boston Braves for Bob Smith and Jimmy Welsh. In a separate transaction, they also purchase Jakie May's contract from the Cincinnati Reds.
November 10 – Veteran pitcher Hippo Vaughn is reinstated by Judge Landis after eight years of ineligibility. Vaughn chose to pitch for a semi-professional team following a salary dispute with Chicago. He will go to spring training with the Cubs in  but will fail to make the team at age 43.
November 23 – At the Polo Grounds, St. Louis Browns outfielder Red Badgro, playing for the NFL New York Giants, catches a touchdown pass against the Green Bay Packers. It is the third TD catch of the season for Badgro, all from quarterback Benny Friedman. In 1981, Badgro will be elected to the Pro Football Hall of Fame.
November 25 – The Sporting News, acting to fill the Most Valuable Player void, announces its selection of  Washington Senators shortstop Joe Cronin in the American League and New York Giants first baseman Bill Terry in the National League.
December 1 – Shano Collins, a native New Englander, is appointed manager of the perennial last-place Boston Red Sox.

Births

January
January 4 – Don McMahon
January 13 – Joe Margoneri
January 14 – Pete Daley
January 23 – Frank Sullivan
January 30 – Sandy Amorós

February
February 1 – Chuck Churn
February 5 – Eric Rodin
February 13 – Al Grunwald
February 17 – Roger Craig
February 18 – Frank House
February 22 – Lyle Luttrell
February 23 – Beatrice Kemmerer
February 26 – Vic Janowicz
February 26 – Ron Negray
February 28 – Frank Malzone
February 28 – Dolan Nichols
February 28 – Ron Samford

March
March 5 – Del Crandall
March 7 – Tom Acker
March 8 – Bob Grim
March 9 – Larry Raines
March 11 – Bobby Winkles
March 12 – Vern Law
March 13 – Doug Harvey
March 16 – Hobie Landrith
March 25 – Rudy Minarcin

April
April 2 – Art Ceccarelli
April 2 – Gordon Jones
April 3 – Wally Moon
April 7 – Richie Myers
April 10 – Frank Lary
April 12 – Johnny Antonelli
April 17 – Hattie Peterson
April 28 – Tom Sturdivant

May
May 1 – Stan Palys
May 5 – Harley Grossman
May 12 – Tom Umphlett
May 20 – Tom Morgan
May 21 – Rudy Regalado

June
June 2 – Bob Lillis
June 8 – Phil Paine
June 12 – Dutch Rennert
June 20 – Rod Graber
June 24 – Neale Henderson
June 25 – Memo Luna
June 25 – Humberto Robinson
June 27 – Bob Trowbridge

July
July 2 – Pete Burnside
July 2 – Jane Moffet
July 2 – Magdalen Redman
July 3 – Al Pilarcik
July 3 – Jim Westlake
July 4 – George Steinbrenner
July 6 – Angelo LiPetri
July 6 – Karl Olson
July 8 – Glen Gorbous
July 8 – Eddie Phillips
July 10 – Beatrice Allard
July 15 – Betty Wagoner
July 17 – Jerry Lynch
July 19 – Marcelino Solis
July 21 – Danny Morejón
July 26 – Glenn Mickens
July 30 – William Bell Jr.
July 30 – Gus Triandos

August
August 4 – Gabe Gabler
August 9 – Milt Bolling
August 9 – Román Mejías
August 11 – Josh Gibson, Jr.
August 13 – Vinegar Bend Mizell
August 13 – Jerry Neudecker
August 13 – Bob Wiesler
August 14 – Dale Coogan
August 14 – Earl Weaver
August 15 – Bob Martyn
August 17 – Buck Varner
August 22 – Frank Ernaga
August 22 – Bob Speake
August 23 – Zeke Bella
August 29 – Dave Cole
August 30 – Frances Vukovich

September
September 1 – Dean Stone
September 5 – Wayne Belardi
September 16 – Ron Mrozinski
September 17 – Jim Umbricht
September 19 – Bob Turley
September 19 – Billy Williams
September 21 – Agnes Allen
September 21 – Billy Muffett
September 22 – Bob Harrison
September 27 – Dick Hall
September 28 – Audrey Deemer

October
October 2 – John Gabler
October 2 – Jim Heise
October 9 – Barbara Anne Davis
October 11 – Bill Fischer
October 12 – Joe Trimble
October 15 – Don Robertson
October 19 – Joe Koppe
October 20 – Bill Froats
October 23 – Solly Drake
October 30 – Don Nicholas

November
November 4 – Dick Groat
November 4 – Guy Morton
November 6 – Bob Darnell
November 8 – Mike Roarke
November 10 – Gene Conley
November 10 – Chick King
November 15 – Harold Bevan
November 16 – Paul Foytack
November 19 – Joe Morgan
November 20 – Don Leppert
November 23 – Jack McKeon
November 24 – Bob Friend

December
December 4 – Harvey Kuenn
December 6 – Barbara Berger
December 7 – Mark Freeman
December 7 – Hal Smith
December 9 – Bob Hazle
December 11 – Eddie O'Brien
December 11 – Johnny O'Brien
December 11 – Andy Varga
December 12 – Raúl Sánchez
December 15 – Haywood Sullivan
December 18 – Mike Baxes
December 18 – Moose Skowron
December 20 – Troy Herriage
December 21 – Danny Kravitz
December 27 – Norm Larker
December 29 – Frank Dezelan
December 30 – Milt Graff

Deaths

January
January 8 – Charlie Flannigan, 38, third baseman/outfielder for the 1913 St. Louis Browns.
January 20 – Jumbo Schoeneck, 57, first baseman for the Chicago Browns, Pittsburgh Stogies, Baltimore Monumentals and Indianapolis Hoosiers from 1884 to 1889, who finished in the top ten in 10 offensive categories of the Union Association in his rookie season.
January 25 – Spencer Heath, 36, relief pitcher for the 1920 Chicago White Sox.
January 30 – Rip Hagerman, 41, pitcher for the Chicago Cubs (1909) and Cleveland Indians  (1914–1916).

February
February 3 – Gus Sandberg, 34, backup catcher for the Cincinnati Reds from 1923 to 1924.
February 13 – Dan Abbott, 67, pitcher for the 1890 Toledo Maumees.
February 14 – Pete Kilduff, 36, second baseman for the New York Giants, Chicago Cubs and Brooklyn Robins from 1917 to 1921, who in the 1920 World Series became one of three outs in Bill Wambsganss's unassisted triple play, the only in Series history.

March
March 11 – Bob Barr, 73, pitcher who played for six different teams of the American Association and National League between 1883 and 1891.
March 12 – Jack Powell, 38, Major League Baseball pitcher
March 15 – George Townsend, 62, catcher who played from 1887 to 1891 with the Philadelphia Athletics and Baltimore Orioles of the American Association.
March 21 – Bill Fagan, pitcher for the New York Metropolitans (1887) and Kansas City Cowboys (1888) of the American Association.
March 25 – Bill Krieg, 71, catcher/outfielder/third baseman for the St. Louis, Pittsburgh, Chicago, Brooklyn and Washington teams from 1884 to 1887, who also won three minor league batting titles in the 1880s.

April
April 5 – Jack McGeachey, 65, backup outfielder who hit .245 with 164 stolen bases in 608 games for six teams from 1886 to 1891.
April 11 – Wayland Dean, 27, pitcher who posted a 24–36 record with a 4.87 ERA for the Giants, Phillies and Cubs from 1924 to 1927.
April 14 – Frank Kitson, 60, pitcher who won 128 games with a 3.18 ERA for six teams from 1898 to 1907.
April 14 – John B. Sheridan, 61, sportswriter for St. Louis newspapers whose column "Back of the Home Plate" appeared in The Sporting News for many years.
April 18 – Jack Stivetts, 62, pitcher for St. Louis Cardinals, Boston Beaneaters and Cleveland Spiders from 1889 to 1899, who collected six 20-win seasons, including 30-win campaigns in 1891 and 1892, and also hurled a no-hitter and won two games in the 1892 championship playoff.
April 23 – Rube Manning, 46, pitcher who posted a 22–32 record with a 3.14 ERA in 84 games for the New York Yankees from 1907 through 1910.
April 23 – Larry Twitchell, 66, outfielder and one of the early sluggers in major league history, who  played from 1886 through 1894 with seven different teams, most prominently for the Detroit Wolverines.
April 26 – Harry Mace, 63, pitcher for the 1891 Washington Statesmen.

May
May 28 – Hal Carlson, 38, National League pitcher, winner of 114 games with the Pirates, Phillies and Cubs from 1917 through 1930, who was stricken with a fatal stomach hemorrhage in his hotel room, five days after his last MLB appearance.

June
June 3 – George Hemming, 61, pitcher who posted a 91–82 record for six different clubs from 1891 through 1897.
June 5 – Lou Say, shortstop who hit .232 in 298 games for eight teams in four different leagues from 1873 to 1884.
June 9 – Lew McCarty, 41, catcher who hit .266 for the Brooklyn, New York and St. Louis National League teams from 1913 to 1921.
June 9 – Harry Patton, 45, relief pitcher who appeared in one game for the 1910 St. Louis Cardinals.
June 10 – Wally Smith, 42, valuable man at all four infield positions, who hit .229 in 201 games for the Cardinals and Senators between 1911 and 1914.
June 22 – Bill Dam, 45, utility outfielder for the 1909 Boston Doves.

July
July 5 – Frederick Fass, 70, pitcher for the 1887 Indianapolis Hoosiers.
July 16 – Zeke Rosebraugh, 53, pitcher for the Pittsburgh Pirates in 1888 and 1889.
July 19 – Will Holland, 68, outfielder for the Baltimore Orioles of the American Association in 1889.
July 26 – Tommy Madden, 46, outfielder for the Boston Beaneaters and New York Highlanders in the early 20th century.

August
August 4 – Sam Jackson, 81, second baseman for the Boston Red Stockings (1871) and the Brooklyn Atlantics (1872), who also became the third English player to reach the majors.
August 7 – Emmett Seery, 69, outfielder who played for seven different teams in all four active leagues during the 19th century.
August 15 – Guy Tutwiler, 41, first baseman for the Detroit Tigers between 1911 and 1913.
August 17 – Harry Maskrey, 68, outfielder who appeared in one game for the Louisville Eclipse of the American Association in 1882.
August 29 – Ben Sanders, 65, pitcher for five seasons, 1888–1892, threw no-hitter on August 22, 1892.

September
September 1 – John Reccius, 70, pitcher and center fielder for the 1882–1883 Louisville Eclipse.
September 7 – Mickey Keliher, 40, first baseman for the Pittsburgh Pirates from 1911 to  1912.
September 14 – Jim McCauley, 67, backup catcher for the St. Louis Browns, Buffalo Bisons, Chicago White Stockings and Brooklyn Grays from 1884 to 1886.
September 19 – Arlie Pond, 57, pitcher for the Baltimore Orioles from 1895 to 1898, as well as a doctor in the U.S. Army between 1898 and 1919.
September 25 – Joe Wilhoit, 44, right fielder for the Boston Braves, Pittsburgh Pirates, New York Giants and Boston Red Sox from 1916 to 1919, who posted the longest hitting streak in baseball history with 69 games in 1919, while playing for the Wichita Jobbers of the Western League.

October
October 9 – Lem Cross, 58, pitcher who posted a 3–6 record with the Cincinnati Reds from 1893 to 1894.
October 29 – Gene Wright, 51, pitcher for the Brooklyn, Cleveland and St. Louis teams from 1901 to 1904.

November
November 7 – Warren Fitzgerald, 62, pitcher who posted a 15–20 record with a 3.66 ERA for the Louisville Colonels from 1891 to 1892.
November 7 – John Hanna, 67, catcher for the Washington Nationals and Richmond Virginians during the 1884 season.
November 19 – John Russell, pitcher for the Brooklyn Robins and Chicago White Sox between 1917 and 1922.
November 20 – William B. Hanna, 68, sportswriter for various New York newspapers since 1888, known for his florid writing style.
November 28 – Ed Hendricks, 45, pitcher for the 1910 New York Giants.

December
December 3 – Harry Baumgartner, 38, relief pitcher who went 0–1 in nine games for the 1920 Detroit Tigers.
December 4 – William Baker, 64, owner of the Philadelphia Phillies from 1913 until his death.
December 5 – Ben Guiney, 72, backup catcher for the Detroit Wolverines during the 1883 and 1884 seasons.
December 9 – Rube Foster, 51, pioneer and driving force in the Negro leagues, as owner and manager of the Chicago American Giants from 1911 to 1925, who in 1920 founded the first stable Negro league, the Negro National League, and won its first three pennants, also regarded as the premier pitcher in black baseball in the century's first decade.
December 9 – Dave Rowe, 76, center fielder for five teams in six seasons between 1877 and 1888, who also managed the Kansas City Cowboys in 1885 and 1888.
December 14 – Al Hubbard, 70, catcher/shortstop for the 1883 Philadelphia Athletics.
December 25 – Fred Clement, 63, shortstop for the 1890 Pittsburgh Alleghenys.
December 29 – Sandy Piez, 42, backup outfielder who spent most of his career as a specialist pinch-runner with the 1914 New York Giants.
December 29 – Ginger Shinault, 38, backup catcher who hit .295 in 35 games for the Cleveland Indians from 1921 to 1922.
December 29 – George Stutz, 37, shortstop who appeared in six games with the 1926 Philadelphia Phillies.

References